Zofia Józefa Zdybicka (born 5 August 1928 in Kraśnik) is a nun and philosopher. She has been a professor at the John Paul II Catholic University of Lublin since 1978. Her order name is Maria Józefa in the Congregation of the Ursulines of the Agonizing Heart of Jesus in Poland. She is a specialist in ontology and the philosophy of religion.

External links
 
Zdybicka Zofia

1928 births
Living people
People from Kraśnik
20th-century Polish Roman Catholic nuns
Ursulines
Ontologists
Philosophers of religion
20th-century Polish philosophers
Polish women philosophers
Polish women academics
Catholic philosophers
21st-century Polish Roman Catholic nuns
Recipients of the Order of Polonia Restituta